Precinct is an unincorporated community in Bollinger County, in the U.S. state of Missouri.

History
A post office called Precinct was established in 1902, and closed in 1904. The community most likely was named for an election precinct located in or around the original town site.

References

Unincorporated communities in Bollinger County, Missouri
Unincorporated communities in Missouri